John J. Burzichelli (born November 14, 1954) is an American Democratic Party politician, who served in the New Jersey General Assembly from 2002 to 2022, where he represented the 3rd Legislative District. He served as the Deputy Speaker of the Assembly from 2006 to 2022.

New Jersey Assembly 
Burzichelli was the Assistant Majority Leader during the 2004-05 session and has been the Assembly's Deputy Speaker since 2006. Burzichelli had been the Mayor of Paulsboro from 1996 until 2011. From 2002 until 2011, he served as both mayor and Assemblyman which was allowed in New Jersey until 2007 when dual mandates were banned. Burzichelli was grandfathered under the law passed and allowed to continue serve in both posts until he stepped down from the mayoral post in 2011. He was president of Paulsboro Chamber of Commerce and a member of the New Jersey State League of Municipalities Executive Board. In the 2011 apportionment based on the results of the 2010 United States census, Republican Domenick DiCicco was moved from the 4th Legislative District into District 3. Burzichelli (with 25,172 votes) and Celeste Riley (23,960) won re-election, defeating DiCicco (20,268) and his running mate Bob Villare (20,528). DiCicco's loss made his seat the only gain by the Democrats in the Assembly in the 2011 election cycle. In December 2016, Burzichelli was one of several Catholic elected officials who supported legislation legalizing assisted suicide, saying that state residents should be able to make their own decisions on a matter that "is about choice". In 2019 the Assisted Suicide bill passed the legislature.  In 2021, he was defeated for reelection in a mild upset.

Committee assignments 
Tourism and Gaming
Budget
Homeland Security and State Preparedness
Appropriations 
Joint Budget Oversight
Legislative Services Commission

Personal life 
Burzichelli is a long-time resident of Paulsboro. His father, John D. Burzichelli also served as mayor of the borough. He is a 1972 graduate of Paulsboro High School. Burzichelli makes a brief cameo in Kevin Smith's film Jersey Girl, parts of which were filmed in Paulsboro. He is owner / producer / distributor of Hill Studio & Scenic. He is as a former movie producer and wrestling promoter. He owns a number of antique fire engines using them for both business (Hill Studio) and pleasure and is a member of the Glasstown Antique Fire Brigade. He also owns the remnants of the Ward LaFrance a now-defunct fire engine manufacturer. Several of his antique fire engines are Ward LaFrance models of varying years. Burzichelli co-authored the book Ward LaFrance Fire Trucks: 1918-1978 Photo Archive. One of his fire trucks, formerly owned by Trenton Psychiatric Hospital, is displayed on the cover. He is one of the founding members of the Boys and Girls Club of Greater Paulsboro and a former President of the Greater Paulsboro Chamber of Commerce. Burzichelli is the co-host of the show Eye on Paulsboro which has been on cable for over 25 years.

Electoral history

Assembly

References

External links
Assemblyman Burzichelli's legislative web page, New Jersey Legislature
New Jersey Legislature financial disclosure forms
2015 2014 2013 2012 2011 2010 2009 2008 2007 2006 2005 2004
Assembly Member John J. Burzichelli, Project Vote Smart
New Jersey Voter Information Website 2003

1954 births
Living people
Catholics from New Jersey
Mayors of places in New Jersey
Democratic Party members of the New Jersey General Assembly
Paulsboro High School alumni
People from Paulsboro, New Jersey
Politicians from Gloucester County, New Jersey
21st-century American politicians